Little but Tough is a 1989 Hungarian drama film directed by Ferenc Grunwalsky. The film was selected as the Hungarian entry for the Best Foreign Language Film at the 63rd Academy Awards, but was not accepted as a nominee.

Cast
 Sándor Gáspár as Bogár Pál
 Ágnes Csere as Zsuzsa
 János Bán as Béla
 Péter Blaskó as Nyomozó
 Zoltán Mucsi as Juszuf
 István Mészáros as Törpe

See also
 List of submissions to the 63rd Academy Awards for Best Foreign Language Film
 List of Hungarian submissions for the Academy Award for Best Foreign Language Film

References

External links
 

1989 films
1989 drama films
Hungarian drama films
1980s Hungarian-language films